Balakata luzonica is a species of flowering plant in the family Euphorbiaceae. It is distributed from the Philippines to New Guinea.

References

Hippomaneae
Flora of New Guinea
Flora of the Philippines
Flora of Luzon
Taxonomy articles created by Polbot
Plants described in 1883
Taxobox binomials not recognized by IUCN